Invisible Woman is a fictional character that appears in comic books published by Marvel Comics.

"Invisible Woman" and similar terms may also refer to:

 Invisible person, a science fiction concept

Film
The Invisible Woman (1940 film), a 1940 science fiction comedy film
The Invisible Woman (1969 film), a 1969 drama film
The Invisible Woman (1983 film), a 1983 science fiction comedy television film
The Invisible Woman (2013 film), a 2013 drama film

Literature
 Daheim unterwegs (known as Invisible Woman in English), the autobiography of Ika Hügel-Marshall
 Invisible Women: Forgotten Artists of Florence, a 2009 book by Jane Fortune
 Invisible Women: Exposing Data Bias in a World Designed for Men, a 2019 book by Caroline Criado-Perez

Other uses
A Mulher Invisível, a Brazilian Emmy-winning comedy series

See also

Invisible Girl (disambiguation)
The Invisible Man (disambiguation)